The All-Ireland Senior Hurling Championship of 1997 (known for sponsorship reasons as the Guinness Hurling Championship 1997) was the 111th staging of Ireland's premier hurling competition.  Clare won the championship, beating Tipperary 0-20 to 2-13  in the final at Croke Park, Dublin.

Pre-championship

The 'back-door' system

Since its inception in 1887 the championship had been played on a straight knock-out basis.  If any team was defeated at any stage of the provincial or All-Ireland competitions it meant automatic elimination.  This system was deemed the fairest as the All-Ireland champions would always be the team who won all of their games.  There were some problems with this system.  Over the years Galway had become the only credible hurling team in Connacht, thus giving them an automatic pass into the All-Ireland semi-finals every year.  Similarly in Ulster there were many problems as hurling was much weaker and confined to a small few counties in the north-east of the province.

In 1995 the Hurling Development Committee began investigating a way of improving hurling in general and revamping the championship.  Their proposals involved allowing the defeated Munster and Leinster finalists to re-enter the All-Ireland championship.  Although the two provincial final winners would automatically qualify for the All-Ireland semi-finals the two defeated provincial teams would join Galway and the Ulster champions in two play-off games or 'quarter-finals'.  The two winners from these two games would then qualify for the semi-finals where they would be drawn against the Leinster and Munster champions.  Repeat games would be avoided in the All-Ireland semi-final stage.

At the start of 1996 these proposals looked unlikely of being introduced, however, a whistle-stop tour undertaken by the committee's secretary Frank Murphy and Pat Daly, the GAA's Games Development Officer, had changed the position.  In April 1996 the committee's proposals were accepted at the GAA's annual congress.  Most counties supported the new proposals and motion 15 (a) was passed with more than a two-thirds majority.

Betting

Prior to the opening of the championship former All-Ireland-winning manager Éamonn Cregan gave his predictions for the upcoming championship in the Irish Times.  As with the previous three championships the field was wide open.  Although they were the reigning champions, Wexford were given little chance of making it two-in-a-row.  The departure of manager Liam Griffin and the sheer exertion of winning the previous years' title meant that Wexford's hurlers, it seemed, had reached their peak.  Wexford's greatest rivals, Kilkenny, were tipped for success.  Having failed to land the provincial title since 1993, former player and current manager Nickey Brennan seemed to have reignited the hunger.  Offaly, a team that had reached two out of the last three championship deciders, were regarded as being up there with Kilkenny.  One problem was the age profile of some of the team's players, while a lack of strength in depth on the bench also militated against Offaly's chances.  The return of Cyril Farrell as manager of the Galway team seemed to give the team a boost.  Farrell guided his native county to three All-Ireland titles in the 1980s and seemed to be blessed with a very strong panel at the start of his third stint as manager.  Limerick, the All-Ireland runners-up of the previous year, were again touted as a team that could make the big breakthrough.  Two All-Ireland final defeats in three years, however, lead some commentators to question the mental toughness of the team.  Clare, the surprise champions of two years earlier, seemed to be in decline and were seen as having reached their zenith in 1995.  Tipperary, however, were viewed as the dark horses of the championship.  Although the 'big three' were in decline for a number of years, a resurgent John Leahy seemed to give Tipp a half-chance of landing the championship title.

The championship

Participating counties

Format

Connacht Championship
Final: (1 match) This is a lone match between the two competing Connacht teams.  One team is eliminated at this stage, while the winners advance to the All-Ireland quarter-final where the play the Leinster runners-up.

Leinster Championship
Preliminary Round: (1 match) This is a single match between the first two teams drawn from the province of Leinster.  One team is eliminated at this stage, while the winners advance to the quarter-finals.

Quarter-finals: (2 matches) The winner of the preliminary round game joins three other Leinster teams to make up the two quarter-final pairings.  Two teams are eliminated at this stage, while two teams advance to the Leinster semi-finals.

Semi-finals: (2 matches) The winners of the two quarter-finals join two other Leinster teams to make up the semi-final pairings.  Two teams are eliminated at this stage, while two teams advance to the Leinster final.

Final: (1 match) The winners of the two semi-finals contest this game.  The winners advance to the All-Ireland semi-final while the runners-up advance to the All-Ireland quarter-final.

Munster Championship

Quarter-final: (2 matches) These are two lone matches between the first four teams drawn from the province of Munster.  Two teams are eliminated at this stage, while two teams advance to the semi-finals.

Semi-finals: (2 matches) The winners of the two quarter-finals join the other two Munster teams to make up the semi-final pairings.  Two teams are eliminated at this stage, while two teams advance to the final.

Final: (1 match) The winners of the two semi-finals contest this game.  The winners advance to the All-Ireland semi-final while the runners-up advance to the All-Ireland quarter-final.

Ulster Championship

Semi-final: (1 match) This is a single match between the first two teams drawn from the province of Ulster.  One team is eliminated at this stage, while the winners advance to the final.

Final: (1 match) The winner of the semi-final joins another Ulster team to contest this game.  One team is eliminated at this stage, while the winners advance to the All-Ireland quarter-final where that play the Munster runners-up.

All-Ireland Championship
Quarter-finals: (2 matches) These are two lone matches between the Connacht champions and the Leinster runners-up, and the Ulster champions and the Munster runners-up.  Two teams are eliminated at this stage, while the winners advance to the All-Ireland semi-finals.

Semi-finals: (2 matches) The Munster and Leinster champions play the winners of the two quarter-finals.  Two teams are eliminated at this stage, while the two winners advance to the All-Ireland final.

Final: (1 match) The two semi-final winners contest the final.

Ulster Senior Hurling Championship

Connacht Senior Hurling Championship

Leinster Senior Hurling Championship

Munster Senior Hurling Championship

All-Ireland Senior Hurling Championship

Championship statistics

Scoring

First goal of the championship: Eamon Morrissey for Dublin against Westmeath (Leinster quarter-final)
Last goal of the championship: Eugene O'Neill for Tipperary against Clare (All-Ireland final)
Hat-trick heroes:
First hat-trick of the championship: Ger Ennis for Dublin against Westmeath (Leinster quarter-final)
Second hat-trick of the championship: Alan Kerins for Galway against Roscommon (Connacht final)
Widest winning margin: 37 points
Galway 6-24 : 0-5 Roscommon (Connacht final)
Most goals in a match: 7
Dublin 5-15 : 2-8 Westmeath (Leinster quarter-final)
Kilkenny 4-15 : 3-16 Galway (All-Ireland quarter-final)
Most points in a match: 37
Limerick 2-20 : 1-17 Waterford (Munster quarter-final)
Clare 1-19 : 0-18 Cork (Munster semi-final)
Most goals by one team in a match: 6
Galway 6-24 : 0-5 Roscommon (Connacht final)
Most goals scored by a losing team: 3
Galway 3-16 : 4-15 Kilkenny (All-Ireland quarter-final)
Down 3-8 : 3-24 Tipperary (All-Ireland quarter-final)
Most points scored by a losing team: 18
Cork 0-18 : 1-19 Clare(Munster semi-final)
Tipperary 0-18 : 1-18 Clare(Munster final)

Discipline

First yellow card of the championship: Alfie Devine for Westmeath against Dublin (Leinster quarter-final)
Last yellow card of the championship: Brian O'Meara for Tipperary against Clare (All-Ireland final)

Miscellaneous
 The meeting of Clare and Tipperary in the All-Ireland final was the first time that two teams from the same province met in the championship decider.

Top scorers

Season

Single game

References
 Corry, Eoghan, The GAA Book of Lists (Hodder Headline Ireland, 2005).
 Donegan, Des, The Complete Handbook of Gaelic Games (DBA Publications Limited, 2005).
 Sweeney, Éamonn, Munster Hurling Legends (The O'Brien Press, 2002).

External links
All-Ireland Senior Hurling Championship 1997 Results

See also

1997
All-Ireland Senior Hurling Championship